The mythology of Oceania and the Gods of the Pacific region are both complex and diverse.  They have been developed over many centuries on each of the islands and atolls that make up Oceania. Some gods are shared between many groups of islands while others are specific to one set of islands or even to a single island. Their exact roles are often overlapping as one god can appear in different places under different names. A god can also appear in many different forms.

References
 Anita Dalal, Myths of Oceania, Steck-Vaughn, (2002); 
 A. W. Reed, Alice Mills, New World Mythology: Myths and Legends of Oceania and the Americas (2009) 
 Roland Burrage Dixon, Oceanic Mythology, Forgotten Books (2008); 
 Garry Trompf, The Religions of Oceania, Routledge (1995); 
 George Grey, Polynesian Mythology, Kessinger Publishing, 2004; 
 Barbara A. West, Encyclopedia of the Peoples of Asia and Oceania, Infobase Publishing, 2009; 
 Roslyn Poignant, Oceanic mythology: the myths of Polynesia, Micronesia, Melanesia, Australia, Hamlyn, 1967; 
 Peter Neal Peregrine, Melvin Ember, Encyclopedia of Prehistory: East Asia and Oceania, Volume 3, 2001; 

Oceanian mythology
Oceanian culture
Mythology